Sebastian Ohlsson (born 31 December 1992), sometimes spelled Sebastian Olsson, is a Swedish footballer who plays for Degerfors IF as a defensive midfielder.

Career

Club career
Ohlsson started playing football at Hova IF. He began his senior career at Skövde AIK, where he played between 2010 and 2013. In November 2013, he signed a three-year contract with BK Häcken. He made his Allsvenskan debut on 24 May 2014 in a 1-1 draw against Falkenbergs FF, replacing 77th minute against Ivo Pękalski. However, he didn't play much and was mostly used on the U21 team. In 2014, Ohlsson won the U21 championship as the team captain, but the lack of playing time in Häcken made him look for alternatives.

In November 2015, Ohlsson signed a two-year contract with Superettan club Degerfors IF. In December 2017, Ohlsson was acquired by Trelleborgs FF, where he signed a three-year contract.

On November 21, 2019, Ohlsson returned to Degerfors IF, where he signed a three-year contract.

References

External links

1992 births
Living people
Association football midfielders
Swedish footballers
Allsvenskan players
Superettan players
Ettan Fotboll players
Skövde AIK players
BK Häcken players
Degerfors IF players
Trelleborgs FF players